Monzon may refer to:

People
 Bernardo Alvarado Monzón (fl. 1972), Guatemalan communist leader
 Carlos Monzón (1942–1995), Argentine middleweight boxer
 Christian Monzon (born 1977), American actor and model
 Dan Monzon (1946–1996), American baseball player, manager, and scout
 Erick Monzón (born 1981), Puerto Rican baseball player
 Fabián Monzón (born 1987), Argentine football player
 Gastón Monzón (born 1987), Argentine football player
 Monzon Diarra (fl. 1795–1808), ruler of the Bambara Empire in Mali
 Pedro Monzón (born 1962), Argentine football player and coach
 Roberto Monzón (born 1978), Cuban Olympic wrestler
 Telesforo Monzón (1904–1981), Basque writer and politician
 Tina Monzon-Palma (born 1951), Filipina anchorwoman
 Víctor Hugo Monzón (born 1957), Guatemalan football player and coach

Places
 County of Monzón, a marcher county of the Kingdom of León in the tenth and eleventh centuries
 Monzón, a town in Huesca Province, Spain
 Monzón Castle
 Monzón de Campos, a municipality in Palencia Province, Spain
 Monzón District, Huamalíes Province, Peru

Other uses
 Monzonite, an intermediate igneous rock